Acne is a 2008 Uruguayan coming-of-age film directed by Federico Veiroj. The film showed in the Director's Fortnight portion of the 2008 Cannes Film Festival.

Plot
A thirteen-year-old guy desperately looking for his first kiss against all odds.

Cast
 Alejandro Tocar (Rafael)
 Julia Catalá
 Belén Pouchan (Nicole)
 Gustavo Melnik
 Jenny Goldstein
 Yoel Bercovici
 Igal Label
 David Blankleider
 Laura Piperno
 Verónica Perrotta

References

External links
 

2008 films
2000s coming-of-age films
2000s Spanish-language films
Uruguayan coming-of-age films